Epsie is an unincorporated community in western Powder River County, Montana, United States.

Geography
Epsie is located in the Mountain Time Zone (MST/MDT), observes Daylight saving time, lies within the 406 area code, and in the 59346 zip code.

Climate
According to the Köppen Climate Classification system, Epsie has a semi-arid climate, abbreviated "BSk" on climate maps.

History 
In May, 1908 Epsie McAllister and her daughter Mildred traveled by train and horse from Oregon to Broadus, Montana to join her husband William. He had started the F. E. ranch in Custer County, Montana about 13 miles east of Broadus at the head of Mizpah Creek with his brothers. In 1918, when a post office was designated, it was named Epsie in honor of Epsie McAllister. In 1919, the townsite became part of the newly created Powder River County, with the town of Broadus as the county seat. The first post office operated for 19 years until 1937, then was moved a few miles north to Highway 212. Epsie had a number of buildings including a store. In 1939, Frank Peterson became the postmaster. In 1940, neighbors found him outside of his house that was on fire, with a mortal gunshot wound. The post office is now closed, and is the only standing remaining building at Epsie.

References

Unincorporated communities in Powder River County, Montana
Unincorporated communities in Montana